Chah Sargahi (also Romanized as Chāh Sargāhī and Chāh-e Sar Gāhī; also known as Chāh-e Saḩargāhī and Sargaya) is a village in Arudan Rural District, in the Central District of Mohr County, Fars Province, Iran. At the 2006 census, its population was 410, in 80 families.

References 

Populated places in Mohr County